Peter Annis is a justice with the Federal Court of Canada. Prior to his appointment he served as a judge on the Ontario Superior Court.

References

Judges of the Federal Court of Canada
Judges in Ontario
Living people
Year of birth missing (living people)